Butterworth Stavely is a fictional character in Mark Twain's 1879 story "The Great Revolution in Pitcairn". He is an American adventurer and filibuster who instigates a coup d'état on the Pitcairn Islands and has himself crowned "Emperor Butterworth I".

Twain based his story on one sentence in a naval report by Royal Navy officer Algernon de Horsey: "One stranger, an American, has settled on the island – a doubtful acquisition", which was probably referring to Peter Butler, a survivor of the 1875 Khandeish shipwreck. The story was probably also inspired by the life of American adventurer Joshua Hill, who briefly ruled the Pitcairn Islands as a dictator in the 1830s.

In the story, Stavely rises to political power by exploiting the internal divisions and suspicions surrounding a lawsuit between Thursday October Christian II and Elizabeth Mills waged over a trespassing chicken. His machinations lead to the impeachment of the chief magistrate James Russell Nickoy, Stavely's election as magistrate, a coup d'état against the "galling English yoke", and his coronation as emperor.

Stavely's cynical manipulation of the easily corruptible islanders has been interpreted as an indictment of U.S. colonialism and the cultural imperialism of American missionaries.

See also
 William Walker (filibuster)
 William A. Chanler

References

 

Fictional American people
Fictional emperors and empresses
Fictional mercenaries
Fictional pirates
Fictional Oceanian people
Literary characters introduced in 1879
Male characters in literature
Mark Twain characters
Pitcairn Islands politicians